Riccardo Santovito (born 6 October 1999) is an Italian football player. He plays for Reggiana.

Club career
On 25 July 2017, he joined Parma youth team.

For the 2018–19 season, he joined Serie C club Lucchese on a season-long loan. He made his Serie C debut for Lucchese on 18 October 2018 in a game against Arzachena, as a starter.

On 20 January 2020, he moved on loan to Rimini.

On 5 October 2020, he was loaned by Reggiana to Renate.

References

External links
 

1999 births
Footballers from Rome
Living people
Italian footballers
Association football defenders
S.S.D. Lucchese 1905 players
A.C. Reggiana 1919 players
Rimini F.C. 1912 players
A.C. Renate players
Serie C players